The  was an educational institution in the Edo period of Japan, originally established to educate children of daimyō (feudal lords) and their retainers in the domains outside of the capital. These institutions were also known as hangaku, hangakkō or hankō. 

These schools existed until 1871, when the domains were abolished after the Meiji Restoration of 1868. The han schools were at first narrowly defined as schools of Confucian studies for the cultivation of the samurai elite, and attendance was both expected of and limited to the children of this class. Late in the period, however, children of other social classes were permitted to attend, and the curriculum was expanded from its core in the Confucian classics to include training in classical Japanese studies (kokugaku), medicine, and the various branches of Western learning, including mathematics, astronomy, military science, and ballistics. Students entered at age 7 or 8 and usually completed their courses of study between the ages of 15 and 20. By the 1860s there were about 255 han schools nationwide.

The han schools, which predominated in provincial regions, were similar to and paralleled the terakoya or "temple-school" system of education which was more prominent in the major urban centers of the capital, Edo, and Osaka and Kyoto. The major difference between the two systems was that hanko were state institutions organized by the local domain government, and terakoya were private institutions organized by local Buddhist temples.

Some of the more famous han schools included Nisshinkan (Aizu), Kōdōkan (Mito), Meirindō (Sendai), Meirinkan (Hagi, Yamaguchi), Jishūkan (Kumamoto) and Saishunkan (Kumamoto).

School types
Domains of Japan
Schools in Japan
Edo period
History of education in Japan